The Gardens of Harlem is an album by multi-instrumentalist and composer Clifford Thornton. It was recorded at the Blue Rock Studio in New York City in April 1974, and was released in 1975 by JCOA Records. On the album, Thornton is joined by members of the Jazz Composer's Orchestra, supplemented by seven musicians playing African percussion instruments. The music was conducted by Jack Jeffers.

Reception

In an article for London Jazz News, Jon Turney stated: "Clifford Thornton... led the final release credited to the co-operative Jazz Composers' Orchestra, and it's a great one. The multiple African percussion that features prominently in the early pieces here energises the music wonderfully. And as the notes made clear, that collection of sounds arises because the whole work explores West African music and how it has travelled 'from West to North Africa, the Caribbean, the South Eastern United States, to Harlem'. He evoked that history by selecting vocal melodies from the territories in question, and orchestrating them... They are fine tunes, orchestrated with great skill, and evocative in their own right. Add some great jazz soloing, and it's a heady brew."

John Corbett called Thornton "another figure whose thin discography distorts his real significance," and described the album as "gorgeous, majestic, intricate."

Writing for The Rolling Stone Jazz Record Guide, Fred Goodman commented: "this... album... remains one of the more satisfying fusions of traditional Third World musics with the American jazz tradition. Thornton's compositions get superb treatment here from the Jazz Composer's Orchestra... Gardens of Harlem weaves together into one grand tapestry the many experimental directions being pursued on the New York scene during that period."

David Hollenberg, in a 1976 review for Mother Jones, commented: "The Jazz Composer's Orchestra... have published ten records... All are ambitious and honest, especially a recent album entitled The Gardens of Harlem... It is not the first time that a jazz musician has attempted to integrate 'primitive' music with jazz... but it is to my knowledge the most thorough and believable attempt."

In a review for AllMusic, Eugene Chadbourne wrote: "There was something of a struggle getting this project finished and released... Gardens of Harlem... perpetually in the oven or being rehearsed in dribs and drabs, was to be [Thornton's] masterpiece, bringing together Afro-Cuban, Jamaican, Ghanaian, Algerian, American blues, and gospel influences as well as a piece based on the cry of a South Carolina fruit vendor. A massive cast was to be involved, including some hot avant-garde jazz soloists and a stage full of percussionists. Slightly more than 50 minutes was eventually released, and the good moments are truly riveting, making one long for the version of this album that might have been created had someone with deeper pockets been around... it is a shame Thornton was unable to create a larger body of work with this kind of vision."

Track listing
All compositions by Clifford Thornton.

 "Ogún Bára" – 5:46 (soloist: Janice Robinson)
 "O Desayo" – 8:02 (soloists: Clifford Thornton, Roland Alexander)
 "Agbadzá" – 9:42 (soloists: Clifford Thornton, Marvin Peterson, Michael Ridley)
 "Changó Obarí" – 4:33 (soloist: Leo Smith)
 "Aïn Salah" – 8:16 (soloist: Clifford Thornton)
 "Gospel Ballade" – 4:44 (soloists: Carla Bley, Charles Stephens)
 "Sweet Oranges" – 1:08
 "Blues City" – 8:57 (soloists: George Barrow, Dewey Redman, Ted Daniel)

Personnel 
 Clifford Thornton – cornet, valve trombone, shenai, cabasa, bell
 Carlos Ward – alto saxophone, flute
 Dewey Redman – alto saxophone, tenor saxophone
 Pat Patrick – tenor saxophone, soprano saxophone
 Roland Alexander – tenor saxophone
 George Barrow – baritone saxophone, flute
 Michael Ridley – trumpet
 Marvin Peterson – trumpet
 Leo Smith – trumpet
 Ted Daniel – trumpet, flugelhorn
 Charles Stephens – trombone
 Janice Robinson – trombone
 John Thompson – French horn
 Gregory Williams – French horn
 Bob Stewart – tuba
 Carla Bley – piano
 Andy González – bass
 Art Lewis – drums
 Kobena Adzenyah – nnawuronta, apentima, oprenten, ntrowa, conga, sogo, atsimevu
 Jerry González – kónkolo bata, kaganu, quinto, tumba, bell, palos
 Milton Cardona – itótele bata, tumba
 Gene Golden – iyá bata, tumba, palos
 Vincent Jorge – tumba, axatse, conga
 Asante Darkwa – gankogui, nnaronta, bell
 Laxmi G. Tewari – axatse, kidi, ntrowa
 Jack Jeffers – conductor

References

1975 albums
Clifford Thornton albums
Jazz Composer's Orchestra albums
JCOA Records albums